"Fingertips" is a 1963 song by Stevie Wonder.

Fingertips may also refer to:

Fingertips, the tips of fingers
Fingertips (plant), or Dudleya edulis, a succulent plant
Finger Tips, a 2001–2008 British children's TV show

Music
Fingertips (band), a Portuguese pop rock band
Fingertips (album) or the title song, by the Cockroaches, 1988
Fingertips (EP), by Vera Blue, 2016
"Fingertips", a suite of songs by They Might Be Giants from Apollo 18, 1992
"Fingertips", a song by Felguk, 2009
"Fingertips", a song by One Republic from Oh My My, 2016
"Fingertips", a song by Tom Gregory, 2020

See also
"Fingertips '93", a song by Roxette
"Fingertip" (song), by GFriend, 2017
Fingertip (web series), a 2019 Indian Tamil-language series